Demir Hisar (formerly Murgaševo until 1946) is a small town in North Macedonia. It is the seat of Demir Hisar Municipality. This small settlement has an absolute Macedonian ethnic majority. The name of the town translates to "Iron Castle" in Turkish, and dates back to the time when Macedonia was ruled by the Ottoman Empire.

Etymology
Due to the richness of these mountains with iron ore, the area was named either Železnik or Železnec, depending on the ruler. This area is also known as "Demir Hisar" a name that the Ottoman Turks gave this area which means "Iron Castle". That name remained till today.

Region

The settlement is situated along the main road between the important Macedonian cities of Bitola and Kičevo. It is made up of smaller villages, including Barakovo.

Demographics
The Yugoslav census of 1953 recorded 902 people in Demir Hisar of whom 449 were Macedonians, 412 Turks, 27 Albanians and 14 others. The 1961 Yugoslav census recorded 1129 people of whom 1047 were Macedonians, 39 Albanians, 24 Turks, and 19 others. The 1971 Yugoslav census recorded 1828 people of whom 1731 were Macedonians, 34 Turks, 30 Albanians, 4 Romani, 1 Bosniak and 28 others. The 1981 Yugoslav census recorded 2283 people of whom were 2145 Macedonians, 75 Albanians, 19 Turks, 17 Romani and 27 others. The Macedonian census of 1994 recorded 2447 people of whom 2336 were Macedonians, 9 Albanians, 4 Turks and 98 others.
According to the 2002 census, the town had a total of 2593 inhabitants. Ethnic groups in the village include:
 Macedonians 2,473 (95.37%)
 Albanians 62 (2.39%)
 Turks 22 (0.85%)
 Romani 11 (0.42%)
 Serbs 7 (0.27%)
 Vlachs 6 (0.23%)
 Bosniaks 2 (0.08%)
 Others 10 (0.39%)

As of the 2021 census, Demir Hisar had 2,431 residents with the following ethnic composition:
Macedonians 2,281 (93.8%)
Persons for whom data are taken from administrative sources 69 (2.8%)
Albanians 39 (1.6%)
Roma 16 (0.7%)
Vlachs 9 (0.4%)
Serbs 5 (0.2%)
Others 12 (0.5%)

History
In statistics gathered by Vasil Kanchov in 1900, the village of Murgaševo was inhabited by 240 Muslim Albanians. In 1905 in statistics gathered by Dimitar Mishev Brancoff, Murgaševo was inhabited by 240 Muslim Albanians.
The population of Demir Hisar (Murgaševo) are Tosks, a subgroup of southern Albanians. In the 2010s, only three Albanian families remain in Demir Hisar and nearby Albanian villagers from Obednik are assisting the community in efforts to repair the dilapidated old village mosque.

Gallery

References

External links

Villages in Demir Hisar Municipality
Cities in North Macedonia
Albanian communities in North Macedonia